The 2011 Pernambuco Brasil Open Series was a professional tennis tournament played on hard courts. It was the first edition of the tournament which was part of the 2011 ATP Challenger Tour. It took place in Recife, Brazil between 4 and 10 April 2011.

Singles main-draw entrants

Seeds

 Rankings are as of March 21, 2011.

Other entrants
The following players received wildcards into the singles main draw:
  Guilherme Clézar
  Tiago Fernandes
  Augusto Laranja
  Bruno Sant'anna

The following players received entry from the qualifying draw:
  José Pereira
  Tiago Slonik
  Thales Turini
  Lars Uebel (withdrew)
  Tiago Lopes (as lucky loser)

Champions

Singles

 Tatsuma Ito def.  Tiago Fernandes, walkover

Doubles

 Giovanni Lapentti /  Fernando Romboli def.  André Ghem /  Rodrigo Guidolin, 6–2, 6–1

External links
ITF Search
ATP official site

2011 ATP Challenger Tour
2011 in Brazilian tennis
April 2011 sports events in South America
Hard court tennis tournaments
Pernambuco,2011